Beam Breakers is a racing game released in 2002. It was published by JoWooD Productions and developed by Similis. The game takes place in the year 2173. It features flying cars in the city of New York.

Gameplay
The highways of New York City are teeming with illegal rush-hour grave-racers. Bad racers end up scraped off the side of skyscrapers while good ones build reputations that some would literally kill for. This is no pedestrian street race scene. It's a contest of minds where confidence, control and a taste for razor's-edge maneuvers separate the original gangsters of the skies from the wannabes and has-been.

Beam Breakers has five cities in 57-mission campaigns. The player has to dodge flying cars and avoid getting caught by the flying police cars. The game also has flying car races where the player races to the first place.

Reception

Beam Breakers received mixed reviews according to the review aggregation website Metacritic. IGN said: "Beam Breakers does manage to create and admirably deliver an enormous, believable, and simply awesome sense of scale and liveliness." However, GameSpot said, "Beam Breakers starts off with a solid concept, but it doesn't quite deliver on it. Though the game does provide a few visceral thrills, it's hard to recommend it to anyone other than someone who is hungry enough for some futuristic racing to look past the game's mediocre production values."

References

External links
 
 

2002 video games
Racing video games
Windows games
Windows-only games
Cyberpunk video games
Video games developed in Germany
Science fiction racing games
JoWooD Entertainment games